Djandje  is a village in the Assoli prefecture in the Kara region  of north-eastern Togo.

References

Populated places in Kara Region
Assoli Prefecture